The glacier rat (Rattus richardsoni) is a species of rodent in the family Muridae. It is endemic to the New Guinea Highlands near Puncak Trikora (=Mt. Wilhelmina) and Puncak Jaya (=Carstensz Pyramid), West Papua, Indonesia.

See also
William Bebb Richardson

References

Rattus
Mammals of Western New Guinea
Mammals described in 1949
Endemic fauna of Indonesia
Taxonomy articles created by Polbot
Rodents of New Guinea